Eldama Ravine is a town in Baringo County, Kenya, a few miles north of the equator, geographical coordinates 0° 30' 0" North, 35° 43' 0" East. It was established as an administrative point by British colonialists and later served as a transit route for lumber harvested from surrounding forests.
 
It was previously the headquarters of the former Koibatek District and Eldama Ravine Constituency.

It has a population of 45,799 (2009 census). It is largely an agricultural trade point producing world popular commercial rose flowers. It is fairly cosmopolitan home to more than half of Kenya's ethnic tribes.

Naming
The Eldama Ravine (E/Ravine) was first known as Shimoni due to the presence of a narrow ravine through which the Eldama Ravine River flows. Eldama, the non-English part of the name, is derived from the Maasai word ‘eldama’, which means narrow gorge. It had two areas known as lembus soi( Mogotio constituency) and lembus mosop(eldama ravine constituency)

The town was established by Nubians who worked as soldiers and transporters for the British IBEA in 1887, white settlers and the native lembus community. It became the headquarters of the Naivasha province, then under the Uganda Protectorate.

References

Populated places in Baringo County